"Gift" is a song recorded by Japanese-American singer-songwriter Ai, released April 24, 2020, by EMI Records. The song served as the theme song for TBS' King's Brunch and subsequently as the fifth and final single from Ai's extended play, It's All Me, Vol. 1.

Background and promotion 
In March 2020, TBS announced Ai would be releasing a song titled "Gift", which would serve as the theme song for their King's Brunch variety show in celebration of its 25th anniversary. The program's chief producer Wataru Hiraga stated that only the chorus of the song would be used for the theme song, but recommended to listen to the full song.

A lyric video teaser was released two days prior to the song's release. In June, "Gift" was revealed to be included on Ai's extended play, It's All Me, Vol. 1 as the fifth and final single.

Music and lyrics 
Billboard Japan described "Gift" as a "message song" that shows the value of Ai, comparing the song to her 2011 single, "Happiness".

Music video 
A music video for "Gift" was released in June 2020. Directed by Kensaku Kakimoto, Ai is seen singing with various flowers in the background, meant to represent life forces. A red thread is shown connecting the flowers, referring to the read thread of fate.

Live performances 
Ai performed "Gift" during her Global Citizen Together at Home performance live on Instagram. She additionally performed the song live on Nippon Television's Sukiri on June 24, 2020.

Track listing 
Digital download and streaming

 "Gift"  — 3:38

Charts

Personnel 
Credits adapted from Tidal.

 Ai Uemura – songwriting, production, lead vocals
 Uta – songwriting, production

Release history

Notes

References 

2020 singles
2020 songs
Songs written by Ai (singer)
EMI Records singles
Universal Music Japan singles
Ai (singer) songs